"Stone by Stone" is a song recorded by the Welsh band Catatonia, taken from their fourth studio album, Paper Scissors Stone. It was written by Mark Roberts and the band, and produced by TommyD. It was released as their only single from that album in 2001.

Recording and release
"Stone by Stone" was released on the Blanco y Negro label on 23 July 2001. It reached 19th position in the UK charts. There were rumours that the band was about to break up, fueled by singer Cerys Matthews entering drug rehabilitation for drinking and smoking. The rumours were denied a month after the release of "Stone by Stone", but confirmed on 21 September, making this the final single release for the band.

Reception
Timothy Mark at NME gave the song a score of one out of ten, describing it "lumpen, the voice grating". He added that the band were "fading from the public consciousness quicker, comparing them to Shane Ritchie" and describing them as "awkwardly out of date". Cyd James of Dotmusic was more favourable, writing: "Highly infectious with a huge, soaraway string-swathed chorus, 'Stone By Stone' is a surefire hit."

Charts

References

Catatonia (band) songs
2001 singles
2001 songs
Blanco y Negro Records singles
Songs written by Mark Roberts (singer)